Gujarat is a state in the western part of India. It has very rich butterfly diversity as it is situated at the geographical meeting point of many types of habitats. Northern Gujarat meets the deserts and semi-arid parts of Pakistan, Saurashtra peninsula has dry scrublands and savannah habitats, Gir has dry deciduous forests, central Gujarat has wetlands and scrublands while south Gujarat touches the Western Ghats and hence it has evergreen and bamboo forests.

According to Butterflies of Gujarat, there are over 193 butterfly species found in Gujarat.  Total 79 of them are seen in South Gujarat.

Gujarat has six families of butterflies:
 Papilionidae
 Pieridae
 Nymphalidae
 Lycaenidae
 Hesperiidae
 Riodinidae

Papilionidae  

 Graphium agamemnon - tailed jay Linnaeus, 1758
 Graphium doson - common jay Felder & Felder, 1864
 Graphium nomius - spot swordtail Esper, 1785
 Papilio demoleus - lime swallowtail Linnaeus, 1758
 Papilio polymnestor - blue Mormon Cramer, 1775
 Papilio polytes - common Mormon Linnaeus, 1758
 Pachliopta aristolochiae - common rose Fabricius, 1775

Pieridae  

 Catopsilia pomona - lemon emigrant Fabricius, 1775
 Catopsilia pyranthe - mottled emigrant Linnaeus, 1758
 Eurema hecabe - common grass yellow Linnaeus, 1758
 Eurema laeta - spotless grass yellow Boisduval, 1836
 Leptosia nina - Psyche Fabricius, 1793
 Pareronia hippia - Indian wanderer Fabricius, 1787
 Appias libythea - western striped albatross Fabricius, 1775
 Belenois aurota - pioneer Fabricius, 1793
 Cepora nerissa - common gull Fabricius, 1775
 Delias eucharis - Indian Jezebel Drury, 1773
 Colotis amata - small salmon Arab Fabricius, 1775
 Colotis aurora - plain orange-tip
 Colotis danae - crimson-tip
 Colotis etrida - little orange-tip
 Colotis fausta - large salmon Arab
 Colotis protractus - blue-spotted Arab
 Colotis vestalis - white Arab
 Ixias marianne - white orange-tip
 Ixias pyrene - yellow orange-tip

Nymphalidae  

 Ariadne ariadne - angled castor
 Ariadne merione - common castor
 Byblia ilithyia - joker
 Charaxes athamas – common nawab
 Charaxes agrarius – anomalous nawab
 Charaxes psaphon - plain tawny rajah
 Charaxes solon - black rajah
 Danaus chrysippus - plain tiger
 Danaus genutia - striped tiger
 Euploea core - common crow
 Euploea klugii - king crow
 Tirumala limniace - blue tiger
 Acraea terpsicore - tawny coster
 Phalanta phalantha - common leopard
 Euthalia aconthea - baron
 Euthalia nais - baronet
 Neptis hylas - common sailer
 Hypolimnas bolina - great eggfly
 Hypolimnas misippus - Danaid eggfly
 Junonia almana - peacock pansy
 Junonia atlites - grey pansy
 Junonia hierta - yellow pansy
 Junonia iphita - chocolate pansy
 Junonia lemonias - lemon pansy
 Junonia orithya - blue pansy
 Kallima horsfieldii - Sahyadri blue oakleaf
 Vanessa cardui - painted lady
 Melanitis leda - common evening brown
 Mycalesis perseus - common bushbrown
 Ypthima asterope - common three-ring
 Ypthima baldus - common five-ring
 Ypthima huebneri - common four-ring

Lycaenidae  

 Curetis dentata - angled sunbeam
 Curetis thetis - Indian sunbeam
 Curetis acuta – acute sunbeam
 Spalgis epius - apefly
 Acytolepis puspa - common hedge blue
 Azanus jesous - African babul blue
 Azanus ubaldus - bright babul blue
 Caleta decidia - angled Pierrot
 Castalius rosimon - common Pierrot
 Talicada nyseus - red Pierrot
 Catochrysops strabo - forget-me-not
 Chilades lajus - lime blue
 Chilades parrhasius - small Cupid
 Luthrodes pandava - plains Cupid
 Euchrysops cnejus - gram blue
 Freyeria putli - Oriental grass jewel
 Jamides celeno - common cerulean
 Lampides boeticus - pea blue
 Leptotes plinius - zebra blue
 Prosotas dubiosa - tailless lineblue
 Prosotas nora - common lineblue
 Tarucus nara - striped Pierrot
 Tarucus balkanicus - little tiger Pierrot (Balkan Pierrot)
 Zizeeria karsandra - dark grass blue
 Zizina otis - lesser grass blue
 Zizula hylax - tiny grass blue
 Cigaritis ictis - common shot silverline
 Cigaritis vulcanus - common silverline
 Arhopala amantes - large oakblue
 Rapala iarbus - common red flash
 Virachola isocrates - common guava blue
 Rathinda amor - monkey puzzle
 Tajuria cippus - peacock royal
 Tajuria jehana - plains blue royal

References

Butterflies
Gujarat